Beyzabad or Bizabad may refer to:
 Beyzabad, Lorestan
 Beyzabad, West Azerbaijan